Steve Romanik (May 27, 1924 – September 16, 2009) was an American football player. Romanik grew up in Millville, New Jersey of a Ukrainian-American family, and played high school football at Millville Senior High School, later serving on the Millville City Commission. He played collegiate football for the Villanova Wildcats, and played quarterback in the NFL from 1950 to 1954 for the Chicago Bears and Chicago Cardinals.

References

1924 births
2009 deaths
American football quarterbacks
Chicago Bears players
Chicago Cardinals players
Millville Senior High School alumni
New Jersey city council members
People from Millville, New Jersey
Sportspeople from Cumberland County, New Jersey
Players of American football from New Jersey
Villanova Wildcats football players
American people of Ukrainian descent
20th-century American politicians